Antilla magmatic complex is a volcano in the Salta Province of Argentina, close to a village of the same name.

Since the Jurassic, subduction off the western margin of South America has been responsible for volcanism in the Andes, including typical volcanic arc activity in the Western Cordillera and back-arc activity in the Altiplano which includes the Antilla system. This back-arc activity is associated with large transversal faults and appears to be linked to crustal delamination processes.

It consists of a group of monogenetic vents that surround the Cerro Negro mountain.

Antilla rocks are compositionally trachybasalts to trachytes. They are porphyritic and contain phenocrysts of amphibole and clinopyroxene. The matrix in addition contains biotite, feldspar, olivine, plagioclase, titanium oxides and iron oxides. Substantial alteration has yielded albite, calcite, epidote, phyllosilicates, sericite and zeolites.

Two different ages have been obtained on Antilla rocks, the first one 4.67 - 4.83 million years ago and the second 7.7 million years ago. The first was obtained by potassium-argon dating while the second originates from argon-argon dating; it is not clear why they are different. Antilla is the easternmost volcanic centre in the area; farther east both a compressional tectonic regime and the Brazilian Craton prevent magmas from reaching the surface.

References

Sources 

  

Volcanoes of Salta Province
Miocene volcanism